The Aruba Police Force (Dutch: Korps Politie Aruba or KPA, Papiamento: Cuerpo Policial Aruba) is the law enforcement agency of Aruba. The force operates under the authority of the Minister of Justice and Social Affairs.

History 

In 1923, the Police Corps consisted of 8 officers and was understaffed. The first police station was an Aruban house located at the corner of Kazernestraat and Theaterstraat in San Nicolaas. It was used as a precinct until 1939. After being taken over by the Public Works Service, it was torn down in 1950. The Oranjestad precinct were housed in the landmark Fort Zoutman and moved to larger facilities by 1967. The fire brigade was placed under the authority of the police from 1954 until 1977, when the forces were separated by the Minister of Justice. Motorcycle officers were added in the early 1970s.

Organization 
The force operates under the authority of the Ministry of Justice and Social Affairs. Day-to-day operations is in the hands of the Chief Commissioner whom together with other police commissioners forms the Management Team,

Divisions 
The Police Force consists out of 3 divisions each headed by a Commissioner of Police 
 General Police Operations (Patrol, Law Enforcement, Tourism Police)
 Criminal Investigation Operations  (Detective, Forensics and Investigations)
 Special Forces (K9, SWAT, Border Patrol, Riot Control, Bike Patrol)

Precincts 
The Police Force has 4 precincts in all districts, with its HQ located in Macuarima. the Police Force also maintains a few community-tourism based post for better policing. Each precincts is headed by a sergeant who reports directly to the commissioner of general operations.

Management

List of Commissioners of Police

Cooperating with other services
When providing aid the police cooperates with other services. When dealing with an accident for example, the police cooperates with ambulance services, doctors and the fire department. The police also has a strong cooperation with the Koninklijke Marechaussee  stationed on the island, when it comes to human and drug trafficking.

Slachtofferhulp
For providing support to victims the police cooperates with Slachtofferhulp (comparable to Victim Support). The employees of Slachtofferhulp are specially trained to provide support to victims of accidents and crime. They make sure that victims are coached, but they also help with filling in forms for insurance or a lawyer.

Notable cases

Susan McCormick case
On February 10, 1996, the KPA faced the first recorded random homicide of a tourist on Aruba. 47-year-old Susan McCormick was an American bartender from Hampton Bays, New York who was found dead at a roadside near the Steamboat restaurant with a bullet in her neck and her wallet still on her person. Officials from the hotel where McCormick had been staying had reportedly told her family that she had died in a car accident. The police were initially puzzled and refused to publicly discuss the case, but told McCormick's sister Sharon Hoyt that there was no sign of a robbery. On February 16, three local youths aged 15, 18, and 19 were arrested after two informants came forward. One of the teens who intended to rob her waved a .38-caliber pistol, which accidentally fired, and fled the scene by car. McCormick's brother-in-law Jim Sofranko, who visited the site of the shooting in search of clues, stated, "I don't think they expected the gun to go off. She was just in the wrong place at the wrong time." Sofranko said the police told him of another case years ago in which a honeymooning groom killed his bride for the insurance money and that "this was the biggest case they ever had."

Mansur family arrests
In October 1997, the Aruba Police Force arrested four men, including Eric and Alex Mansur of the powerful Mansur family, for extradition to the United States. They were among 85 individuals indicted in the U.S. District Court of Puerto Rico on federal charges of involvement in a Caribbean money laundering ring following an FBI sting called Operation Golden Trash.

Ranks

See also
Law enforcement in the Netherlands 
Illegal drug trade in Aruba
Europol
Interpol

References

External links
Korps Politie Aruba (Aruba Police Force) official site
Aruba Chapter of the International Police Association

Law enforcement in Aruba